Geneva is a town in Talbot County, Georgia, United States. The population was 114 at the 2000 census.

History
The Georgia General Assembly incorporated the Town of Geneva in 1870. The community's name is a transfer from Geneva, in Switzerland.

Geography

Geneva is located at  (32.579438, -84.550485).

The town is located in the southern portion of the county along U.S. Route 80, which leads north 8 mi (13 km) to Talbotton, the county seat, and west 33 mi (53 km) to Columbus. The newly constructed Fall Line Freeway also runs through the town as well, leading east 6 mi (10 km) to Junction City, concurrent with Georgia State Route 96, which begins in the town. Georgia State Route 41 also runs through the town, following U.S. Route 80 to Talbotton and leading south 20 mi (32 km) to Buena Vista.

Demographics

As of the census of 2000, there were 114 people, 52 households, and 34 families residing in the town. The racial makeup of the town was 45.61% White, 52.63% African American, and 1.75% from two or more races.

There were 52 households, out of which 23.1% had children under the age of 18 living with them, 50.0% were married couples living together, 7.7% had a female householder with no husband present, and 34.6% were non-families. 28.8% of all households were made up of individuals, and 13.5% had someone living alone who was 65 years of age or older. The average household size was 2.19 and the average family size was 2.74.

In the town, the population was spread out, with 16.7% under the age of 18, 7.0% from 18 to 24, 29.8% from 25 to 44, 31.6% from 45 to 64, and 14.9% who were 65 years of age or older. The median age was 44 years. For every 100 females, there were 103.6 males. For every 100 females age 18 and over, there were 106.5 males.

The median income for a household in the town was $18,750, and the median income for a family was $27,750. Males had a median income of $13,750 versus $18,125 for females. The per capita income for the town was $14,839. There were no families and 14.9% of the population living below the poverty line, including no under eighteens and 15.0% of those over 64.

References

Towns in Talbot County, Georgia
Towns in Georgia (U.S. state)